The Co-operative and Community Benefit Societies and Credit Unions Act 2010 (c.7) is an Act of the Parliament of the United Kingdom that received Royal Assent on 18 March 2010.

Provisions 
The Act provides that:
 Industrial and Provident Societies will be either a Co-operative Society or a Community Benefit Society or a Pre-2010 Act Society.
 Like companies, organisations registered as societies under the Co-operative and Community Benefit Societies and Credit Unions Act 1965 will be subject to the Company Directors Disqualification Act 1986. Board or Management Committee members will be treated like company directors.
 Societies registered under the 1965 Act may be made subject to additional Companies Act 2006 provisions, following consultation, which may relate to: Investigations of companies, company names, dissolution and restoration to the register.
 Renames related acts including 'Industrial and Provident Societies Act 1965' to 'Co-operative and Community Benefit Societies and Credit Unions Act 1965'.

Parliamentary process 
The Bill was first presented (first reading) in the House of Lords on 19 November 2009 and received its third reading on 14 January 2010. It was first read in the House of Commons on 14 January 2010 and received its third reading on 12 March 2010.

See also
 Co-operative and Community Benefit Societies Act 2014
 Industrial and provident society

References

United Kingdom Acts of Parliament 2010
Co-operatives in the United Kingdom